Joseph Shea may refer to:

 Joseph Francis Shea (1925–1999), NASA manager and aerospace engineer
 Joe Shea (1947–2016), editor-in-chief of The American Reporter
 Joseph Shea (FBI agent) (1919–2005), FBI agent
 Joseph Hooker Shea (1863–1928), U.S. ambassador to Chile
 Joseph Shea (Jesuit) (1829–1881), Jesuit priest and president of St. John's College (now Fordham University)
 Joseph H. Shea, American soldier and Medal of Honor recipient

See also
 John Joseph Shea, officer in the United States Navy